Shivers, also known as The Parasite Murders and They Came from Within, and, for Canadian distribution in French, Frissons ('chills' or 'shivers'), is a 1975 Canadian science fiction body horror film written and directed by David Cronenberg and starring Paul Hampton, Lynn Lowry, and Barbara Steele.

Plot 
At Starliner Towers, a luxury apartment complex outside of Montreal, Dr. Emil Hobbes murders a young woman named Annabelle. He slices open her stomach, pours acid into the wound and then commits suicide. Nick Tudor, who has been suffering from stomach convulsions, finds their bodies but leaves without calling the police. The two bodies are found by resident doctor Roger St. Luc, who calls the police. Hobbes' medical partner, Rollo Linsky, tells St. Luc that he and Hobbes had been working on a project to create "a parasite that can take over the function of a human organ".

After suffering more convulsions, Nick leaves work early. He vomits a parasite over the railing of his balcony. The parasite slithers back into the apartment, where it attacks a cleaning woman in the basement, attaching itself to her face. His wife Janine tries to care for him, but he ignores her and prefers to talk to the parasites undulating in his abdomen. At the clinic, Roger sees a sexually active middle-aged resident who has been suffering from stomach convulsions. Roger speculates that his condition might be an STD that he caught from Annabelle.

Linsky calls Roger from Hobbes' office downtown to tell him that Hobbes had developed a parasite that was "a combination of aphrodisiac and venereal disease that will, hopefully, turn the world into one beautiful mindless orgy". Hobbes believed modern humans had become over-intellectual and estranged from their primal impulses. Hobbes' ambition with his parasitic invention was to reassert humanity's unbridled, sexually aggressive instincts, and he used Annabelle as his guinea pig. Linsky warns Roger not to approach anyone who is behaving in a strange manner.

Nick tries to force Janine to have sex with him, but she recoils in horror when one of the parasites crawls from his mouth. She rushes to the apartment of her friend Betts, who was infected by one of the parasites while taking a bath. Betts seduces Janine and as they kiss, passes a parasite to her. Meanwhile, other residents, including a little girl in an elevator with her mother, who are assaulted by a deliveryman,  become infected with the parasite, attack other residents and continue to spread the infection. Soon the hallways are full of people sexually assaulting or fighting one another. Roger combs the complex looking for the parasites while Forsythe—his nurse and lover—tends to an elderly couple who were attacked by one of the parasites.

Linsky arrives at Starliner Towers and goes to the Tudor apartment, as Roger had identified Nick as someone Annabelle might have infected. He finds Nick lying in bed, parasites crawling on his abdomen. When Linsky examines him more closely, one of the parasites latches onto his cheek. Linsky tries to pull it off with pliers, but Nick kills him and swallows the parasite. Forsythe tries to flee the complex in her car but is attacked by the infected security guard. Before he can rape her, Roger arrives and kills him, and the two hide in the basement. Forsythe tells Roger of a dream that mixed eroticism and death, then vomits up a parasite. Roger knocks her out and tries to carry her to safety, but they are attacked by a horde of infected sex maniacs. Roger is separated from Forsythe and is forced to flee as she is overwhelmed by the infected.

Roger kills Nick in his apartment, then tries to escape the complex, but is thwarted at every turn. He finally makes it to the swimming pool area where he encounters Janine and Betts swimming fully clothed. The two walk to the edge of the pool and smile seductively at him as he finds a door to the outside, but the infected block his path and he is pulled into the pool by Janine and Betts. The rest of the infected, including the little girl from the elevator, plunge into the pool fully dressed or otherwise and swim towards Roger to hold him down. Roger is eventually surrounded and finally infected by Forsythe.

Roger, Forsythe and the other Starliner residents drive out of the building's garage. Early the next morning, news reports encourage listeners not to panic as police investigate an epidemic of sexual assaults in Montreal.

Cast

Production and response 
Shivers was filmed over fifteen days at Tourelle-Sur-Rive, a 1962 apartment building designed by Mies van der Rohe, on Rue de Gaspé, Nuns' Island. It was Cronenberg's third feature film. Working titles included The Parasite Complex, Starliner, and Orgy of the Blood Parasites.

Release 
The film opened in the United States under the title They Came From Within, with regional showings beginning in San Antonio, Texas, on September 26, 1975. It was released in Montreal on October 10, 1975, distributed by Cinépix.

Both Shivers and The Parasite Murders were used as titles in Canada, as well as Frissons for Francophone Canada. Shivers was used in the United Kingdom.

Home media 
The film was released on DVD by Image Entertainment on September 16, 1998.

On September 15, 2020, Lionsgate issued the film on Blu-ray in the United States as part of its Vestron Video Collector's Series. This release includes, among other features, a new commentary by Cronenberg.

Reception 
Making $1 million in Canada, Shivers was one of the highest-grossing English-language Canadian films of all time, and more profitable than any previous Canadian film.

Critical reaction to the initial release of the movie was negative, however. Of a selection of 28 reviews from Canada, the United States, the United Kingdom, Belgium, and France, 16 reviews were negative—12 of these very negative—versus 6 that were positive. Of the positive reviews, 3 were very positive. 6 reviews were neutral. Canadian critics such as Martin Knelman, in The Globe and Mail, and Dane Larnken, in the Montreal Gazette, gave the film negative reviews. American critic Roger Ebert noted that while he expected Shivers to be a dismal exploitation film, since it was part of a double bill with the purported snuff film Snuff, he instead was impressed by much of the movie. He gave it 2 stars. 

The site's consensus states, "Shivers uses elementally effective basic ingredients to brilliant and lays the profoundly unsettling foundation for director David Cronenberg's career to follow".

Canadian journalist Robert Fulford (writing as Marshall Delaney) decried the content of Shivers in the national magazine Saturday Night. Since Cronenberg's film was partially financed by the taxpayer-funded Canadian Film Development Corporation (later known as Telefilm Canada), Fulford headlined the article with "You should know how bad this film is. After all, you paid for it." He called it "crammed with blood, violence and depraved sex", and "the most repulsive movie I've ever seen." Not only did this high-profile attack make it more difficult for Cronenberg to obtain funding for his subsequent movies, but, according to Cronenberg, the article resulted in him being kicked out of his apartment in Toronto, due to his landlord's inclusion of a "morality clause" in the lease. The controversy over the sexual and violent content of Shivers grew to the point that the Parliament of Canada debated the film's social and artistic value and effect upon society.

Related works 
The screenplay was published by Faber & Faber in the 2002 collection David Cronenberg: Collected Screenplays 1: Stereo, Crimes of the Future, Shivers, Rabid.

 See also 
 Parasites in fiction
 Rabid''

Notes

References

Bibliography

External links 

 
 Interview with David Cronenberg about Shivers (CBC television via TIFF)

1975 films
1970s English-language films
1975 horror films
1970s science fiction horror films
Canadian body horror films
Canadian independent films
Canadian LGBT-related films
Canadian natural horror films
Canadian science fiction horror films
Canadian zombie films
English-language Canadian films
Erotic horror films
Films directed by David Cronenberg
Films produced by Ivan Reitman
Films set in apartment buildings
Films set in Montreal
Films shot in Montreal
Fictional parasites and parasitoids
LGBT-related science fiction horror films
1975 directorial debut films
1975 LGBT-related films
Canadian monster movies
1970s Canadian films